UCCLA may refer to:
Ukrainian Canadian Civil Liberties Association
União das Cidades Capitais Luso-Afro-Américo-Asiáticas